Karen Byrne (born 30 May 1992) is an Irish dancer and choreographer. She is known as being one of the professional dancers on the Irish version of Dancing with the Stars.

Early life 
Byrne was born in Ballyfermot in Dublin. She has been dancing since the age of six.

Dancing with the Stars 
In 2017, Byrne was announced as one of the professional dancers for the first series of Dancing with the Stars. She was partnered with RTÉ broadcaster, Des Cahill. Despite being in the bottom half of the leader board throughout the entire competition, they reached the quarterfinals of the competition eventually finishing in 5th place.

In 2018, Byrne was partnered with singer-songwriter, Jake Carter. On 25 March 2018, Carter and Byrne were named the winners.

In 2019, Byrne was partnered with TV presenter and style entrepreneur, Darren Kennedy. They reached the fifth week of the competition, finishing in ninth place.

In 2020, Byrne partnered with Olympic gold medal-winning boxer, Michael Carruth. The couple reached the fifth week of the competition, meaning Byrne finished in ninth place for the second year in a row.

In 2022, Byrne partnered former professional cyclist, Nicolas Roche. They were eliminated in the quarterfinals, after a dance-off against Ellen Keane and Ervinas Merfeldas.

In 2023, Byrne partnered former rugby player, Shane Byrne. They were eliminated in the eighth week of the competition, after a dance-off against Panti Bliss and Denys Samson.

Highest and Lowest Scoring Per Dance

1 These scores was awarded during Switch-Up Week.

Series 1 

 Celebrity partner
 Des Cahill; Average: 16.7; Place: 5th

Series 2 

 Celebrity partner
 Jake Carter; Average: 26.3; Place: 1st

Series 3 

 Celebrity partner
 Darren Kennedy; Average: 16.5; Place: 9th

Series 4 

 Celebrity partner
 Michael Carruth; Average: 12.5; Place: 9th

Series 5 

 Celebrity partner
 Nicolas Roche; Average: 17.4; Place: 6th

Series 6 

 Celebrity partner
 Shane Byrne; Average: 18.5; Place: 7th

Personal life 
Byrne was in a relationship with professional dancer, Wojtek Potaszkin for eight years. Since their time on the show together, Byrne has been dating her Series 2 partner, Jake Carter.

References 

1992 births
Living people
Ballroom dancers